The Fence at Alamo Cement Company is a Faux Bois sculpture by artist Dionicio Rodriguez. The sculpture is a 125-foot-long concrete faux wood fence laid out in approximately a “C” shape and features an elaborate entrance way formed by two sculpted tree trunks. The sculpture was posted to the National Register of Historic Places on August 9, 2005.

References

External links
National Register Listing

National Register of Historic Places in San Antonio
1926 sculptures
Buildings and structures on the National Register of Historic Places in Texas
1926 establishments in Texas